Faso Latido is the second album by post-hardcore band A Static Lullaby.  It was released in 2005 on Columbia Records, making it their only release on a major label. This album is one of the albums known to be affected by Extended Copy Protection. This is the last album with all five original members. Before Phil Pirrone and Nate Lindeman left to form Casket Salesmen as well as the departure of former drummer Brett Dinovo. The album was originally to be titled "Watch the Sunlight Burn", but was changed prior to its release. A music video was created for the song "Stand Up".

Background
Shortly after the release of their debut, ...And Don't Forget to Breathe, the band was signed to major label Columbia Records. The song "Radio Flyer's Last Journey" originally appeared on the band's self-titled demo EP, released in 2001.

Reception
Faso Latido was generally met with negative feedback. The band treats this album just like Weezer's Pinkerton and the members of the band openly admit they dislike this album. When playing songs from the album live, they apologize to the fans for playing the song. However, many fans cite this album as the best from A Static Lullaby.

Absolute Punk reviewer Scott Weber was very critical of the album, particularly for the high amounts of clean singing. Weber said the screams in "Stand Up" were awkward and out of place with the "laid back musicianship" and the song sounded like any other radio song with screaming. He did however praise the song "Radio Flyer's Last Journey" for its energy.

A more positive review came from Melodic.net's Kaj Roth. Roth commented on the more commercial and melodic sound of the album, and said fans of the debut ...And Don't Forget to Breathe would be very disappointed. Roth concluded by saying the band's energy and attitude make up for the change in sound, but said the album doesn't have many stand out tracks. Another positive review came from Allmusic. The reviewer praised "Radio Flyer's Last Journey" for its chugging guitar riffs and "Half Man, Half Shark; Equals One Complete Gentleman" for use of a delay-pedal. Another praise was the band's lyrical content, which was different from "the usual emo notebook romance".

Though the album received lukewarm reception from both fans and critics, Faso Latido is the band's highest charting album on the Billboard 200, charting at no. 129.

Track listing
All lyrics written by Joe Brown and Dan Arnold, all music composed by A Static Lullaby

Personnel
 Joe Brown - unclean vocals
 Dan Arnold - clean vocals, piano, programming, keyboards, rhythm guitar
 Nate Lindeman - lead guitar
 Phil Pirrone - bass guitar, backing vocals
 Brett Dinovo - drums, percussion

References

A Static Lullaby albums
2005 albums
Columbia Records albums
Albums produced by Lou Giordano